Hans Pietsch may refer to:
 Hans Pietsch (Go player)
 Hans Pietsch (mathematician)